Andrea Alejandra Álvarez González (8 June 1994 – 4 August 2021) better known as Zelá Brambillé, was a Mexican writer and novelist, who became well known through the Wattpad network. One of her works, Miradas Azucaradas, has exceeded 20 million readings in Wattpad.

She died of COVID-19 pneumonia at the age of 27 during the COVID-19 pandemic in Mexico.

Career
From a very young age she was always interested in the world of literature and in creating her own stories. She started uploading her books to the Internet in 2013, which today have more than 70 million readings. In 2017, Nova Casa Editorial published her books "Luz de luciérnaga" and "Somos electricidad", and later "Miradas azucaradas".
In 2018, her work "Tiempo de ceniza" was the finalist in the "II Premio Oz de Novela". This contest is held  by Oz Editorial.

Works
 2017: Luz de luciérnaga 
 2017: Somos electricidad
 2018: Miradas azucaradas
 2018: Tiempo de ceniza
 2019: Gardenia

References

External links
 
 Zelá Brambillé on Goodreads

1994 births
2021 deaths
Mexican women novelists
21st-century Mexican women writers
Writers from Monterrey
Wattpad writers
Mexican YouTubers
Deaths from the COVID-19 pandemic in Mexico